Shemysheysky District is an administrative and municipal district (raion), one of the twenty-seven in Penza Oblast, Russia. It is located in the southeastern central part of the oblast. Its administrative center is the urban locality (a work settlement) of Shemysheyka. Population: 17,661 (2010 Census);  The population of Shemysheyka accounts for 36.9% of the district's total population.

References

Notes

Sources

Districts of Penza Oblast